Captain Ahab was the captain of the Pequod in Herman Melville's 1851 novel Moby-Dick.

Captain Ahab may also refer to:

 Captain Ahab (band), a Los Angeles-based pop/electronic band
 Capitaine Achab, (English title: Captain Ahab), a French film directed by Philippe Ramos
 Captain Ahab: The Story of Dave Stieb, a baseball documentary produced by Secret Base

See also
Ahab (disambiguation)